Ahn or AHN may refer to:

People
 Ahn (Korean surname), a Korean family name occasionally Romanized as An
 Ahn Byeong-keun (born 1962), South Korean judoka
 Ahn Eak-tai (1906–1965), Korean composer and conductor
 Ahn Jung-hwan (born 1976), South Korean footballer
 Ahn Cheol-soo (born 1962), founder of AhnLab Inc, an antivirus software company 
 Kristie Ahn (born 1992), American tennis player
 Natalie Ahn (born 1957), American chemist and biochemist
 Philip Ahn (1905-1978), American actor
 Ralph Ahn (1926-2022), American actor
 Viktor An, (born 1985 as Ahn Hyun-soo) South Korean short track speed skater
 Luis von Ahn, (born 1978) Guatemalan creator of CAPTCHA and co-founder of Duolingo

Other uses
 Ahn, Luxembourg, a town
 All Headline News, a US news agency
 Allegheny Health Network, a non-profit hospital and healthcare group in Pennsylvania
 Ashton-under-Lyne railway station, UK (National Rail code)
 Athens–Ben Epps Airport serving Athens-Clarke County, Georgia, US (IATA airport code)